The Willaston General Cemetery on Dawkins Avenue, Willaston, South Australia opened on 1 August 1866. to replace the original burial ground on Murray Street, Gawler, South Australia was made in the mid 1850s, with the headstones from the original cemetery moved to the entrance.

Interments at the cemetery include:
 Ephraim Henry Coombe, (1858–1917) journalist and politician
 Leslie Duncan, (1880–1952), newspaper editor and politician
 Walter Duffield, (1816–1882) miller, pastoralist and politician
 Job Harris, (1840–1882) prominently associated with the discovery of gold at the Barossa Goldfields
 James Martin, (1821–1899) manufacturer and politician
 Frederick May, (1840–1897) engineer and manufacturer
 John McKinlay, (1819–1872) explorer
 Esmond Walter New, (1900–1982) Presbyterian minister and air force chaplain

References

External links
 Willaston Cemetery burial register
 

1862 establishments in Australia
Cemeteries in South Australia
Commonwealth War Graves Commission cemeteries in Australia
South Australian Heritage Register